Pilu or Peelu is a raga of Hindustani classical music. It is mostly used in light-classical forms, like thumris.

Arohana and Avarohana

Arohana 
P 'N S g m P N SN S G m P N SS g m P D SS R m P N S

Avarohana 
S' N D P m G m P g R S 'N SS' N S' D n D P m G m P G P m g R S 'N S

Some performances include shades of  MA

Vadi and Samvadi 
Ga as vadi

Ni as samvadi

Pakad or Chalan

S g R g S R 'N S, G m n P g - S

S g R S 'N S 'N - 'P 'd 'P 'N S  - g R g 'N S

Organization and relationships
Related ragas: Kirwani resembles an ancient kind of Pilu.

Thaat: Bhatkhande classified Pilu in the Kafi thaat).

Samay (time) 
Third part of the day

Seasonality
Often related to the monsoon season, this raag is popular in the occasion of Hindu festival "Holi" [Phalguna (February - March) month] also known as Raga of colours for its smpoorna jaati and blissful nature.
http://www.tanarang.com/english/pilu_eng.htm-get more information about Raga PiluCAPTCHA

Rasa
Cheerful, Joyous, Alegre, moving. are synonymical expressions.

Thaat
Kafi
In this raga, both Ga, Dha, Ni are sung

Historical information

Origins

Important recordings
 Shankar–Menuhin, West Meets East; debuted 10 December 1967
 Nikhil Banerjee:Pilu
 Ab Ke Baras Bhej: Bandini (1963); Singer: Asha Bhosle, Music:S.D. Burman
 Ezhumalai vazh Govinda: Vindhaigal Purindhai Nee En Vazhvile (2012); Singer: Harini, Music: Manachanallur Giridharan

Film Songs

Language:Tamil 
Note that the following songs are composed in Kapi, the equivalent of raga Pilu in Carnatic music.

Telugu Film Songs

References

Sources 

 
 
 .

External links 
 More details about raga Piloo

Hindustani ragas